Pegues is a surname. 

Notable people bearing the surname include the following:

Derek Pegues (born 1986), American football player
Jeff Pegues (born 1974), American news correspondent
Juliana Pegues, American writer, performer and community activist
Lou Courtney, American soul singer and songwriter born Louis Pegues (born 1943)
Mike Pegues (born 1978), American college basketball coach and former player
Steve Pegues (born 1968), American former Major League Baseball player